Bellusco is a comune (municipality) in the Province of Monza and Brianza in the Italian region Lombardy, located about  northeast of Milan.

References

External links
 Official website

Cities and towns in Lombardy
Populated places on Brianza